The Parish of Tarrabandra is a cadastral parish of Ularara County New South Wales.

The Burke and Wills expedition were the first Europeans to the area, passing a few miles to the west.
The climate is semi-arid, featuring low rainfall, very hot summer temperatures and cool nights in winter. 
 
The parish has a Köppen climate classification of BWh (Hot desert).

References

Parishes of Ularara County
Far West (New South Wales)